Mali Bač is a small settlement near Bač, Serbia. Although it is physically separated from the Bač town, Mali Bač is not officially regarded as a separate settlement, but as part of Bač. Its name means "little Bač" in Serbian.

See also
List of places in Serbia
List of cities, towns and villages in Vojvodina

Bač, Serbia
Places in Bačka